Zhong Jinbao (born 25 November 1994) is a Chinese professional footballer who currently plays for Chinese Super League side Henan Jianye.

Club career
In 2013, Zhong Jinbao started his professional footballer career with Henan Jianye in the China League One. On 16 August 2015, Zhong made his debut for Henan in the 2015 Chinese Super League against Guangzhou R&F, coming on as a substitute for Mirahmetjan Muzepper in the 53rd minute. He scored his first senior goal on 24 July 2016 in a 4–1 away loss against Jiangsu Suning.

Career statistics 
Statistics accurate as of match played 31 December 2020.

Honours

Club
Henan Jianye
China League One: 2013

References

External links
 

1994 births
Living people
Chinese footballers
Footballers from Wuhan
Henan Songshan Longmen F.C. players
Chinese Super League players
China League One players
Association football midfielders